Colombia is scheduled to compete at the 2024 Summer Olympics in Paris from 26 July to 11 August 2024. It will be the nation's twenty-first appearance at the Summer Olympics except for Helsinki 1952.

Competitors
The following is the list of number of competitors in the Games.

Athletics

Colombian track and field athletes achieved the entry standards for Paris 2024, either by passing the direct qualifying mark (or time for track and road races) or by world ranking, in the following events (a maximum of 3 athletes each):

Track and road events

Football

Summary

Women's tournament

Colombia women's football team qualified for the Olympics by advancing to the final match of the 2022 Copa América Femenina in Bucaramanga.

Team roster
 Women's team event – one team of 18 players

See also
Colombia at the 2023 Pan American Games
Colombia at the 2024 Summer Paralympics

References

2024
Nations at the 2024 Summer Olympics
2024 in Colombian sport